Les Unruh (born c.1934) is a former American football coach. He served as the head football coach at Sterling College in Sterling, Kansas for four seasons, from 1977 to 1980, compiling a record of 10–25–1.

Head coaching record

References

Year of birth uncertain
Living people
Sterling Warriors football coaches
High school football coaches in Arizona
Year of birth missing (living people)